"I Love You" is the fourth UK number-one hit single (and the second of the 1960s) by Cliff Richard and the Shadows. It was written by the Shadows' rhythm guitarist Bruce Welch. Released in November 1960, it was a Christmas No. 1 and stayed at the chart summit for two weeks, although it did not carry a traditional holiday theme. The song also reached No. 1 in New Zealand.

It took until 1977 before another song entitled "I Love You" entered the UK Singles Chart.  It was recorded by Donna Summer.

Track listing
 "I Love You" – 2:02
 "'D' in Love" – 2:29

Personnel
 Cliff Richard – vocals
 Hank Marvin – lead guitar
 Bruce Welch – rhythm guitar
 Jet Harris – bass guitar
 Tony Meehan – drums

Charts

References

1960 singles
1960 songs
Cliff Richard songs
Songs written by Bruce Welch
Song recordings produced by Norrie Paramor
UK Singles Chart number-one singles
Number-one singles in New Zealand
Dutch Top 40 number-one singles
Columbia Graphophone Company singles
Christmas number-one singles in the United Kingdom